The Vienna Convention on Consular Relations is an international treaty that defines a framework for consular relations between sovereign states. It codifies many consular practices that originated from state custom and various bilateral agreements between states.

Consuls have traditionally been employed to represent the interests of states or their nationals at an embassy or consulate in another country. The Convention defines and articulates the functions, rights, and immunities accorded to consular officers and their offices, as well as the rights and duties of "receiving States" (where the consul is based) and "sending States" (the state the consul represents).

Adopted in 1963, and in force since 1967, the treaty has been ratified by 182 states.

History
The Convention was adopted on 24 April 1963 following the United Nations Conference on Consular Relations in Vienna, Austria from 4 March to 22 April 1963. Its official texts are in English, French, Chinese, Russian and Spanish; the Convention provides that the five versions are equally authentic.

Key provisions
The treaty contains 79 articles. The preamble to the Convention states that customary international law continues to apply to matters not addressed in the Convention. Some significant provisions include.
 
 Article 5 lists thirteen functions of a consul, including "protecting in the receiving State the interests of the sending State and of its nationals … within the limits permitted by international law", “helping and assisting nations … of the sending State”, and "furthering the development of commercial, economic, cultural and scientific relations between the sending State and the receiving State."
 Article 23 provides that the host nation may at any time and for any reason declare a particular member of the consular staff to be persona non grata, and that the sending state must recall this person within a reasonable period of time, or the person may lose their consular immunity.
 Article 31 provides that the consular premises are inviolable (i.e., the host nation may not enter the consular premises, and must protect the premises from intrusion or damage).
 Article 35 provides that freedom of communication between the consul and their home country must be preserved, that consular bags "shall be neither opened nor detained"; and that a consular courier must never be detained.
 Article 36 addresses communications between consular officers and nationals of the sending state. The Convention provides that "consular officers shall be free to communicate with nationals of the sending State and to have access to them." Foreign nationals who are arrested or detained be given notice "without delay" of their right to have their embassy or consulate notified of that arrest, and "consular officers shall have the right to visit a national of the sending State who is in prison, custody or detention, to converse and correspond with him and to arrange for his legal representation."
 Article 37 provides that with the host country must "without delay" notify consular officers of the sending state if one of the sending state's nationals dies or has a guardian or trustee appointed over him. The article also provides that consular officers must be informed "without delay" if a vessel with the sending state's nationality is wrecked or runs aground "in the territorial sea or internal waters of the receiving State, or if an aircraft registered in the sending State suffers an accident on the territory of the receiving State."
 Article 40 provides that "The receiving State shall treat consular officers with due respect and shall take all appropriate steps to prevent any attack on their person, freedom or dignity."
 Articles 58-68 deal with honorary consular officers and their powers and functions.

Consular immunity
The Convention (Article 43) provides for consular immunity. Some but not all provisions in the Convention regarding this immunity reflect customary international law. Consular immunity is a lesser form of diplomatic immunity. Consular officers and consular employees have "functional immunity" (i.e., immunity from the jurisdiction of the receiving state "in respect of acts performed in exercise of consular function"), but do not enjoy the broader "personal immunity" accorded to diplomats.

State parties to the Convention

There are 182 state parties to the Convention, including most UN member states and UN observer states Holy See and State of Palestine. The signatory states that have not ratified the Convention are: Central African Republic, Israel, Ivory Coast and Republic of Congo. The UN member states that have neither signed nor ratified the Convention are: Afghanistan, Burundi, Chad, Comoros, Guinea-Bissau, Ethiopia, Palau, San Marino and South Sudan.

Application of the treaty by the United States
In March 2005, following the decisions of the International Court of Justice in the LaGrand case (2001) and Avena case (2004), the United States withdrew from the Optional Protocol to the Convention concerning the Compulsory Settlement of Disputes, which confers the ICJ with compulsory jurisdiction over disputes arising under the Convention.

In 2006, the United States Supreme Court ruled that foreign nationals who were not notified of their right to consular notification and access after an arrest may not use the treaty violation to suppress evidence obtained in police interrogation or belatedly raise legal challenges after trial (Sanchez-Llamas v. Oregon). In 2008, the U.S. Supreme Court further ruled that the decision of the ICJ directing the United States to give "review and reconsideration" to the cases of 51 Mexican convicts on death row was not a binding domestic law and therefore could not be used to overcome state procedural default rules that barred further post-conviction challenges (Medellín v. Texas).

In 1980, prior to its withdrawal from the Optional Protocol, the U.S. brought a case to the ICJ against Iran—United States Diplomatic and Consular Staff in Tehran (United States v Iran)—in response to the seizure of United States diplomatic offices and personnel by militant revolutionaries.

References

External links
 Text of the Convention
 Implications of the Vienna Convention on Consular Relations upon the Regulation of Consular Identification Cards
 U.S. Quits Pact Used in Capital Cases: Foes of Death Penalty Cite Access to Envoys – Washington Post article by Charles Lane
 Introductory note by Juan Manuel Gómez Robledo, procedural history note and audiovisual material on the Vienna Convention on Consular Relations in the Historic Archives of the United Nations Audiovisual Library of International Law
 Lecture by Eileen Denza entitled Diplomatic and Consular Law – Topical Issues in the Lecture Series of the United Nations Audiovisual Library of International Law

Consular affairs
Cold War treaties
Treaties concluded in 1963
Treaties entered into force in 1967
Diplomatic immunity and protection treaties
Treaties of Albania
Treaties of Algeria
Treaties of Andorra
Treaties of the People's Republic of Angola
Treaties of Antigua and Barbuda
Treaties of Argentina
Treaties of Armenia
Treaties of Australia
Treaties of Austria
Treaties of Azerbaijan
Treaties of the Bahamas
Treaties of Bahrain
Treaties of Bangladesh
Treaties of Barbados
Treaties of the Byelorussian Soviet Socialist Republic
Treaties of Belgium
Treaties of Belize
Treaties of the People's Republic of Benin
Treaties of Bhutan
Treaties of Bolivia
Treaties of Bosnia and Herzegovina
Treaties of Botswana
Treaties of the military dictatorship in Brazil
Treaties of Brunei
Treaties of the People's Republic of Bulgaria
Treaties of Burkina Faso
Treaties of Cambodia
Treaties of Cameroon
Treaties of Canada
Treaties of Cape Verde
Treaties of Chile
Treaties of the People's Republic of China
Treaties of Colombia
Treaties of Costa Rica
Treaties of Croatia
Treaties of Cuba
Treaties of Cyprus
Treaties of the Czech Republic
Treaties of Czechoslovakia
Treaties of North Korea
Treaties of Zaire
Treaties of Denmark
Treaties of Djibouti
Treaties of Dominica
Treaties of the Dominican Republic
Treaties of Ecuador
Treaties of Egypt
Treaties of El Salvador
Treaties of Equatorial Guinea
Treaties of Eritrea
Treaties of Estonia
Treaties of Fiji
Treaties of Finland
Treaties of France
Treaties of Gabon
Treaties of the Gambia
Treaties of Georgia (country)
Treaties of West Germany
Treaties of East Germany
Treaties of Ghana
Treaties of the Kingdom of Greece
Treaties of Grenada
Treaties of Guatemala
Treaties of Guinea
Treaties of Guyana
Treaties of Haiti
Treaties of the Holy See
Treaties of Honduras
Treaties of the Hungarian People's Republic
Treaties of Iceland
Treaties of India
Treaties of Indonesia
Treaties of Pahlavi Iran
Treaties of Ba'athist Iraq
Treaties of Ireland
Treaties of Italy
Treaties of Jamaica
Treaties of Japan
Treaties of Jordan
Treaties of Kazakhstan
Treaties of Kenya
Treaties of Kiribati
Treaties of Kuwait
Treaties of Kyrgyzstan
Treaties of the Kingdom of Laos
Treaties of Latvia
Treaties of Lebanon
Treaties of Lesotho
Treaties of Liberia
Treaties of the Libyan Arab Jamahiriya
Treaties of Liechtenstein
Treaties of Lithuania
Treaties of Luxembourg
Treaties of Madagascar
Treaties of Malawi
Treaties of Malaysia
Treaties of the Maldives
Treaties of Mali
Treaties of Malta
Treaties of the Marshall Islands
Treaties of Mauritania
Treaties of Mauritius
Treaties of Mexico
Treaties of the Federated States of Micronesia
Treaties of Monaco
Treaties of the Mongolian People's Republic
Treaties of Montenegro
Treaties of Morocco
Treaties of the People's Republic of Mozambique
Treaties of Myanmar
Treaties of Namibia
Treaties of Nauru
Treaties of Nepal
Treaties of the Netherlands
Treaties of New Zealand
Treaties of Nicaragua
Treaties of Niger
Treaties of Nigeria
Treaties of Norway
Treaties of Oman
Treaties of Pakistan
Treaties of the State of Palestine
Treaties of Panama
Treaties of Papua New Guinea
Treaties of Paraguay
Treaties of Peru
Treaties of the Philippines
Treaties of the Polish People's Republic
Treaties of the Estado Novo (Portugal)
Treaties of Qatar
Treaties of South Korea
Treaties of Moldova
Treaties of the Socialist Republic of Romania
Treaties of the Soviet Union
Treaties of Rwanda
Treaties of Samoa
Treaties of São Tomé and Príncipe
Treaties of Saudi Arabia
Treaties of Senegal
Treaties of Serbia and Montenegro
Treaties of Seychelles
Treaties of Singapore
Treaties of Slovakia
Treaties of Slovenia
Treaties of the Somali Republic
Treaties of South Africa
Treaties of Francoist Spain
Treaties of Sri Lanka
Treaties of Saint Kitts and Nevis
Treaties of Saint Lucia
Treaties of Saint Vincent and the Grenadines
Treaties of Sierra Leone
Treaties of the Republic of the Sudan (1985–2011)
Treaties of Suriname
Treaties of Sweden
Treaties of Switzerland
Treaties of Syria
Treaties of Tajikistan
Treaties of Thailand
Treaties of North Macedonia
Treaties of East Timor
Treaties of Togo
Treaties of Tonga
Treaties of Trinidad and Tobago
Treaties of Tunisia
Treaties of Turkey
Treaties of Turkmenistan
Treaties of Tuvalu
Treaties of the Ukrainian Soviet Socialist Republic
Treaties of the United Arab Emirates
Treaties of the United Kingdom
Treaties of Tanzania
Treaties of the United States
Treaties of Uruguay
Treaties of Uzbekistan
Treaties of Vanuatu
Treaties of Venezuela
Treaties of Vietnam
Treaties of South Vietnam
Treaties of the Yemen Arab Republic
Treaties of Yugoslavia
Treaties of Zambia
Treaties of Zimbabwe
United Nations treaties
1963 in Austria
Treaties extended to the Faroe Islands
Treaties extended to Greenland
Treaties extended to Aruba
Treaties extended to the Netherlands Antilles
Treaties extended to Akrotiri and Dhekelia
Treaties extended to Saint Christopher-Nevis-Anguilla
Treaties extended to Bermuda
Treaties extended to the British Antarctic Territory
Treaties extended to the British Indian Ocean Territory
Treaties extended to the British Virgin Islands
Treaties extended to the Cayman Islands
Treaties extended to the Falkland Islands
Treaties extended to Gibraltar
Treaties extended to Guernsey
Treaties extended to the Isle of Man
Treaties extended to Jersey
Treaties extended to Montserrat
Treaties extended to the Pitcairn Islands
Treaties extended to Saint Helena, Ascension and Tristan da Cunha
Treaties extended to South Georgia and the South Sandwich Islands
Treaties extended to the Turks and Caicos Islands
Treaties extended to British Antigua and Barbuda
Treaties extended to British Dominica
Treaties extended to British Grenada
Treaties extended to British Saint Lucia
Treaties extended to British Saint Vincent and the Grenadines
Treaties extended to the British Solomon Islands